The 19611/12 and 19613/14 Ajmer–Amritsar Express is an express train belonging to North Western Railway zone of Indian Railways that run between  and  in India.

Background
This line was announced on the 2006-07 Rail budget, by Lalu Prasad Yadav (Former Minister of Railways) as a Jaipur–Amritsar Express with bi-weekly frequency of both sets, having numbers of 19771/72 (1st set) & 19781/82 (2nd set) with termination at  & . which it makes direct connectivity for state capital of Rajasthan & famous holy place of Punjab.

Both sets were run till 23 February 2013 and thereafter 24 February 2013 it was extended to Ajmer Junction after the approval of North Western Railway for the demand of people of direct connectivity of both holy places and also the number of trains was changed to 19611/12 (1st set) & 19613/14 (2nd set).

Service
The 1st set of this line covers the distance of 1008 km with an average speed of 50 km/h and 2nd set of this line covers a distance of 849 km with an average speed of 52 km/h.

Routes & halts

Traction
As this route of both sets is going to be electrification, an Abu Road-based WDM-3A or -based WDP-4 / WDP-4B / WDP-4D locomotive pulls the train to its destination on both sides.

Direction reversal
 Train number 19611/12 reverses its direction once at; .
 Train number 19613/14 reverses its direction once at; .

External links
 19611 Ajmer–Amritsar Express via Firozpur
 19612 Amritsar–Ajmer Express via Firozpur
 19613 Ajmer–Amritsar Express via Dhuri
 19614 Ajmer–Amritsar Express via Dhuri

References

Rail transport in Rajasthan
Rail transport in Haryana
Rail transport in Punjab, India
Express trains in India